The 825th Aircraft Control and Warning Squadron is an inactive United States Air Force unit. It was last assigned to the Spokane Air Defense Sector, Air Defense Command, stationed at Kamloops Air Station, British Columbia, Canada. It was inactivated on 1 March 1963.

The unit was a General Surveillance Radar squadron providing for the air defense of North America.

Lineage
 Constituted as the 825th Aircraft Control and Warning Squadron
 Activated on 1 April 1957
 Discontinued on 1 April 1962

Assignments
 25th Air Division, 1 April 1957
 Spokane Air Defense Sector, 15 March 1960 - 1 April 1962

Stations
 McChord AFB, Washington, 1 April 1957
 Kamloops Air Station, British Columbia, 1 September 1957 – 1 April 1962

References

 Cornett, Lloyd H. and Johnson, Mildred W., A Handbook of Aerospace Defense Organization  1946 - 1980,  Office of History, Aerospace Defense Center, Peterson AFB, CO (1980).

External links

Radar squadrons of the United States Air Force
Aerospace Defense Command units